The Lungwitzbach  is a river of Saxony, Germany. It is a right tributary of the Zwickauer Mulde, which it joins near Glauchau.

See also
List of rivers of Saxony

Rivers of Saxony
Rivers of Germany